Pazard or Pa Zard may refer to:
 Pazard, Jask, Hormozgan Province
 Pazard, alternate name for Aghushk Khoshk Kari, Hormozgan Province
 Pazard, Sistan and Baluchestan